Red Mill Farm is a historic farm complex and national historic district located at Colosse in Oswego County, New York.  The district includes a number of contributing structures; the farmhouse, tool shop (ca. 1832), granary (ca. 1832), horse barn (ca. 1832), silo, garage, milkhouse, and windmill. The farmhouse was built about 1832 and is a three bay, two story frame building.

It was listed on the National Register of Historic Places in 1991.

References

Farms on the National Register of Historic Places in New York (state)
Historic districts on the National Register of Historic Places in New York (state)
Historic districts in Oswego County, New York
National Register of Historic Places in Oswego County, New York